Larry Lee Ned, Jr. (born August 23, 1978) is a former American football running back in the National Football League. He was drafted by the Oakland Raiders in the sixth round of the 2002 NFL Draft but never played for them and played for the Minnesota Vikings in 2002 and 2003. He played college football for the San Diego State Aztecs.

College career 
Larry Ned played at San Diego State from 1998-2001.  He was known as a workhorse running back, as his career totals are 765 carries for 3,562 yards, and 36 touchdowns.  Ned's senior year in 2001 was his most productive, in which he ran for 1549 yards on 311 carries (most in the NCAA), and scored 15 touchdowns.  Ned had 3 games in the 2001 season in which he rushed for over 200 yards, including 285 yards against Eastern Illinois, and 239 yards against BYU.  In his final collegiate game against Wyoming, Ned put together the signature performance of his career, rushing a whopping 47 times for 209 yards, and scoring four touchdowns.  Ned's 47 carries in a single game remains a school record, and he ranks 4th all time on the San Diego St career rushing list.

In 2018, Larry Ned was inducted into the San Diego St Hall of Fame.

College Statistics

References

1978 births
Living people
People from Eunice, Louisiana
Players of American football from Louisiana
American football running backs
San Diego State Aztecs football players
Minnesota Vikings players